The Kaiabara are an indigenous Australian people of the state of Queensland. Rather than an independent tribe, they may have been a horde of the Wakka Wakka.

Country
They constituted a rather small tribe, and R. H. Mathews considered it more appropriate to write of a 'family' or 'triblet'.

Social organization
The Kaiabara marriage system's description was contested among early ethnographers. R. H. Mathews in several articles claimed that it was matrilineal while Alfred William Howitt, followed by Andrew Lang, argued that descent was patrilineal.

Howitt initially posited that there was a general class system he and Lorimer Fison called the Gamilaraay type, with a variant common in south-eastern Queensland stipulating descent through the male line, citing the Kaiabara as one of the Bunya mountain tribes which exemplified the pattern. Relying on information garnered by correspondence with Jocelyn Brooke, a Sub-Inspector attached to the Australian native police, he divided the Kaiabara into two phratries, each having two clans within their respective subdivisions, with the following results:-

Establishing these general divisions, he concluded that the marriage rules were as follows:-

Howitt's schema caused a technical perplexity, causing the amateur ethnographer Andrew Lang to speak of an 'intricate puzzle', for Howitt was arguing that, viewed in terms of the phratries and their subclasses, the descent was from the father whereas, viewed in terms of the totems associated with them, the descent was in the female line. Unlike Howitt, Mathews had personally interviewed the relevant tribal elders to ascertain the facts and verify the models proposed. As a result, he formulated the following system:

Alternative names
 Bujibada
 Bujibara. (buji means carpet snake)
 Bujiebara, Booyieburra, Buijibara
 Cooyarbara
 Kaia. (toponym for the Cooyar Range and Mount Cooyar)
 Kaibara. (typo)
 Kaiyabora
 Kiabara
 Koiabara

Source:

Notes

Citations

Sources

Aboriginal peoples of Queensland